Hexura rothi is a species of spider in the family Mecicobothriidae. It was described by Gertsch & Platnick, 1979 — USA.

It has two spinnerets. It is found in the southern Central Oregon Coast Ranges through the Klamath Mountains into Del Norte, California.

References

Mygalomorphae
Spiders of the United States
Spiders described in 1979